The Romanian Ambassador to China is the official representative of the Government in Bucharest to the Government in Beijing (People's Republic of China).

He is concurrently accredited in Naypyidaw (Myanmar) as well as in Ulaanbator (Mongolia).

China is nowadays Romania's largest commercial partner after the EU and the accelerating pace of bilateral trade.

List of Ambassadors 

China–Romania relations

References 

 
China
Romania